Barmaryee is a rural locality in the Livingstone Shire, Queensland, Australia.

Geography 
The land use is a mix of rural residential and grazing land in the west of the locality, suburban residential development in the east of the locality, with the south of the locality containing the racecourse and the landfill.

The Rockhampton-Yeppoon Road (as Yeppoon Road) runs along part of the southern boundary.

History 
The most common responses for religion were Catholic 32.9%, Anglican 20.2% and No Religion 18.6%.

Education 
There are no schools in Barmaryee. The nearest government primary school is Yeppoon State School in neighbouring Yeppoon to the east. The nearest government secondary school is Yeppoon State High School, also in Yeppoon.

Facilities 
Yeppoon Landfill is at 2745 Yeppoon Road. It is operated by Livingstone Shire Council.

Amenities 
There are a number of parks in the locality, including:
 Kingston Park
 Racecourse Road Park

 Stanley Ave Park

Attractions 
Yeppoon Turf Club operates Keppel Park Racecourse is at 65 Racecourse Road.

References 

Shire of Livingstone
Localities in Queensland